Acacia ramiflora is a shrub of the genus Acacia and the subgenus Plurinerves that is endemic to an inland area of north eastern Australia.

See also
List of Acacia species

References

ramiflora
Taxa named by Karel Domin
Plants described in 1926
Flora of Queensland